Saulxures-lès-Nancy (literally Saulxures near Nancy) is a commune in the Meurthe-et-Moselle department in north-eastern France, located  east of Nancy.

The Château de Saulxures de Nancy dates from the reign of Louis XV, and was built c1730 by Count Claude-Marcel de Rutant, an ally of the Duke of Lorraine.

The parish church of St Martin dates from the 18th century and was extended in the 1840s. The village has a primary school named after the author Maurice Barrès.

See also
 Communes of the Meurthe-et-Moselle department

References

Saulxureslesnancy